Lee Robert Maddison (born 5 October 1972) is a former professional association footballer, who played in The Football League, Scottish Football League and the Scottish Premier League.

Maddison, who was born in Bristol, started playing football for his local junior team, Avon Athletic, before joining Bristol Rovers as a trainee. In July 1991 he was awarded his first professional contract, and his senior debut came on 11 January 1992 in a game against Tranmere Rovers. While with The Pirates he had a brief spell on loan with their landlords, Bath City, early in 1993 and he made four appearances for them in the Football Conference. In all he played 73 times for Bristol Rovers in the League without scoring a goal, and he moved on to Northampton Town in 1995.

In a two-year spell with The Cobblers Maddison played 52 League games, again without scoring, before heading north to join Scottish Football League team Dundee. The following year Dundee became founder members of the newly formed Scottish Premier League. He was loaned out to Carlisle United in 2000, and after playing 12 times in the League, the deal was made permanent late in January 2001. He played a further 52 games for the Cumbrian club, and after a loan spell with Oxford United in 2002 he returned to Scottish football with Gretna in 2003.

In 2004, he was diagnosed with non-Hodgkin lymphoma, and although he played a small number of games after this, it effectively ended his footballing career.

References

External links

1972 births
Living people
Footballers from Bristol
English footballers
Association football defenders
English Football League players
National League (English football) players
Scottish Football League players
Scottish Premier League players
Bristol Rovers F.C. players
Bath City F.C. players
Northampton Town F.C. players
Dundee F.C. players
Carlisle United F.C. players
Oxford United F.C. players
Gretna F.C. players